U.S. President Jimmy Carter (born October 1, 1924) has received numerous accolades, awards, and honorary degrees. Several places, institutions, and other things have been named for him.

Honorary degrees and memberships
Carter has received honorary degrees from many American and foreign colleges and universities. They include:
 LL.D. (honoris causa) Morehouse College, 1972; Morris Brown College, 1972; University of Notre Dame, 1977; Emory University, 1979; Kwansei Gakuin University, 1981; Georgia Southwestern College, 1981; New York Law School, 1985; Bates College, 1985; Centre College, 1987; Creighton University, 1987; University of Pennsylvania, 1998; Queen's University, 2012
 D.Eng (honoris causa) Georgia Institute of Technology, 1979
 Ph.D (honoris causa) Weizmann Institute of Science, 1980; Tel Aviv University, 1983; University of Haifa, 1987
 D.H.L. (honoris causa) Central Connecticut State University, 1985; Trinity College, 1998; Hoseo University, 1998
 Doctor (honoris causa) G.O.C. University, 1995; University of Juba, 2002
 Honorary Fellow of Royal College of Surgeons in Ireland, 2007
 Honorary Fellow of Mansfield College, Oxford, 2007
 University of Oxford Doctor of Civil Law (DCL) on 20 June 2007
 Hong Kong Baptist University Doctor of Humanities, 2011
 Liberty University Doctor of Humanities (DH) on 19 May 2018

He was made an honorary member of The Phi Beta Kappa Society at Kansas State University in 1991.

Accolades
Among the honors Carter has received are the Presidential Medal of Freedom in 1999 and the Nobel Peace Prize in 2002. Others include:
 Freedom of the City of Newcastle upon Tyne, England, 1977
 Silver Buffalo Award, Boy Scouts of America, 1978
 Gold Medal, International Institute for Human Rights, 1979
 International Mediation medal, American Arbitration Association, 1979
 Martin Luther King Jr., Nonviolent Peace Prize, 1979
 International Human Rights Award, Synagogue Council of America, 1979
 Foreign Language Advocate Award, Northeast Conference on the Teaching of Foreign Languages, 1979
 Conservationist of the Year Award, 1979
 Harry S. Truman Public Service Award, 1981
 Ansel Adams Conservation Award, Wilderness Society, 1982
 Human Rights Award, International League of Human Rights, 1983
 World Methodist Peace Award, 1985
 Albert Schweitzer Prize for Humanitarianism, 1987
 Edwin C. Whitehead Award, National Center for Health Education, 1989
 S. Roger Horchow Award for Greatest Public Service by a Private Citizen, Jefferson Awards, 1990
 Liberty Medal, National Constitution Center, 1990
 Spirit of America Award, National Council for the Social Studies, 1990
 Physicians for Social Responsibility Award, 1991
 Aristotle Prize, Alexander S. Onassis Foundation, 1991
 W. Averell Harriman Democracy Award, National Democratic Institute for International Affairs, 1992
 Spark M. Matsunaga Medal of Peace, US Institute of Peace, 1993
 Humanitarian Award, CARE International, 1993
 Conservationist of the Year Medal, National Wildlife Federation, 1993
 Audubon Medal, National Audubon Society, 1994
 Rotary Award for World Understanding, 1994
 J. William Fulbright Prize for International Understanding, 1994
 National Civil Rights Museum Freedom Award, 1994
 UNESCO Félix Houphouët-Boigny Peace Prize, 1994
  Grand-Cross of the Order of Vasco Núñez de Balboa of Panama, 1995
 Four Freedom Award; Freedom Medal, 1995
 Bishop John T. Walker Distinguished Humanitarian Award, Africare, 1996
 Humanitarian of the Year, GQ Awards, 1996
 Kiwanis International Humanitarian Award, 1996
 Indira Gandhi Prize for Peace, Disarmament and Development, 1997
 Jimmy and Rosalynn Carter Awards for Humanitarian Contributions to the Health of Humankind, National Foundation for Infectious Diseases, 1997
 United Nations Human Rights Award, 1998
 The Hoover Medal, 1998
 The Delta Prize for Global Understanding, Delta Air Lines & The University of Georgia, 1999
 International Child Survival Award, UNICEF Atlanta, 1999
 William Penn Mott Jr., Park Leadership Award, National Parks Conservation Association, 2000
 Zayed International Prize for the Environment, 2001
 Jonathan M. Daniels Humanitarian Award, VMI, 2001
 Herbert Hoover Humanitarian Award, Boys & Girls Clubs of America, 2001
 Christopher Award, 2002
 Pulitzer Prize Finalist in Biography or Autobiography, 2002
 Grammy Award for Best Spoken Word Album, National Academy of Recording Arts and Sciences, 2007
 Georgia Writers Hall of Fame, the University of Georgia, 2006
 Berkeley Medal, University of California campus, May 2, 2007
 International Award for Excellence and Creativity, Palestinian Authority, 2009
 Mahatma Gandhi Global Nonviolence Award, Mahatma Gandhi Center for Global Nonviolence, James Madison University (shared with his wife, Rosalynn Carter)
 Recipient of 2009 American Peace Award along with Rosalynn Carter
 International Catalonia Award 2010
  Knight-Grand-Cross of the Order of the Crown of Belgium, by Royal Decree of King Albert II of the Belgians, 2011
 International Advocate for Peace award, Cardozo Journal of Conflict Resolution at Cardozo School of Law, 2013
 The O'Connor Justice Prize, 2015.
 The President's Medal, Emory University, 2015
Liberty and Justice For All Award, LBJ Foundation, 2016
The  Order of Manuel Amador Guerrero of the of Panama, 2016
 Grammy Award for Best Spoken Word Album, National Academy of Recording Arts and Sciences, 2016
Georgia Hunting and Fishing Hall of Fame, 2016 
Ivan Allen Jr. Prize for Social Courage, Georgia Institute of Technology, 2017
Gerald R. Ford Medal for Distinguished Public Service, 2017
 Bill Foege Global Health Award, 2018
 Induction into the Georgia Agricultural Hall of Fame, the University of Georgia, 2018
 Grammy Award for Best Spoken Word Album, National Academy of Recording Arts and Sciences, 2019
Tzedek v’Shalom award, J Street, 2021

Namesakes

Navy submarine
In 1998, the U.S. Navy named the third and last Seawolf-class submarine the USS Jimmy Carter (SSN-23) in honor of former President Carter and his service as a submariner officer. It became one of the first Navy vessels to be named for a person living at the time of naming.

Fish species
In 2002, a fish species was given a scientific name after him, the bluegrass darter (Etheostoma jimmycarter), for his environmental leadership and accomplishments in the areas of national energy policy and wilderness protection, and his lifelong commitment to social justice and basic human rights.

Grammy Awards
President Carter has been nominated for the Grammy Awards 9 times in the Best Spoken Word Album category, winning three times.

Spoken Word Grammy

His win in 2019 at the age of 94 years and 132 days made him the third oldest person to win a Grammy. Record holder is Pinetop Perkins, who was 97 when he won a Grammy in 2011 (one month before his death). Carter is the oldest Grammy winner who is still alive.

References`

Jimmy Carter
Carter